Fernando de Jesus (born 2 February 1897) was a Portuguese footballer who played as forward.

External links 
 
 

1897 births
Portuguese footballers
Association football forwards
S.L. Benfica footballers
Portugal international footballers
Year of death missing
Footballers from Lisbon